This is a list of members of the Western Australian Legislative Council from 22 May 1914 to 21 May 1916. The chamber had 30 seats made up of ten provinces each electing three members, on a system of rotation whereby one-third of the members would retire at each biennial election.

Notes
 On 13 July 1914, South-East Liberal MLC Charles Piesse died. Country candidate George Sewell won the resulting by-election on 18 August 1914.
 On 16 May 1915, Metropolitan-Suburban Province Liberal MLC Douglas Gawler died. Liberal candidate Athelstan Saw won the resulting by-election on 26 June 1915.
 On 8 March 1916, South-East Country MLC George Sewell died. Country candidate James Greig was returned unopposed on 20 April 1916.
 On 19 February 1916, South-West Province Liberal MLC John Winthrop Hackett died. A by-election was called to coincide with the upcoming Council elections on 13 May 1916.

Sources
 
 
 

Members of Western Australian parliaments by term